Hausfeldstraße is a station on  of the Vienna U-Bahn. It is located in Aspern in the Donaustadt District. It opened in 2013.

The station used to allow transfer to a nearby railway stop Wien Hausfeldstraße until it closed on 1 October 2018.

References

External links

Buildings and structures in Donaustadt
Railway stations opened in 2013
Vienna U-Bahn stations
2013 establishments in Austria
Railway stations in Austria opened in the 21st century